Vnukovo District  is an administrative district (raion) of Western Administrative Okrug, and one of the 125 raions of Moscow, Russia. Most of the district is occupied by Vnukovo International Airport, a small adjacent residential area, and a separate residential micro-district.

Economy
The economy of the district is dominated by Vnukovo International Airport.   The district is 11 km southwest of the Moscow Ring Road, and 30 km southwest of the Moscow city center.  Red Wings Airlines has its head office in the okrug.

See also

Administrative divisions of Moscow

References

Notes

Sources

Districts of Moscow